Commercial Road is a road in London.

Commercial Road may also refer to:
 Commercial road, Ooty, a roadway in Ooty, Tamil Nadu, India
 Commercial Road Primary School, a primary school in Morwell, Victoria, Australia
 Commercial Road, Melbourne, a roadway in South Yarra, Victoria, Australia
 Commercial Road, Newport, a main road in Newport, Wales
 Commercial Road, Gloucester

See also
 Commercial Road Lock,  a lock on the Regent's Canal, in the London Borough of Tower Hamlets